Joseph Omicil, Jr, known professionally as Jowee BasH! Omicil, is a Haitian-Canadian jazz musician. He has worked in the past with artists such as Randy Kerber, Ibrahim Maalouf,Tony Allen, Jacob Desvarieux, Roy Hargrove, Michel Martelly, Glen Ballard and Francisco Mela. Born in Montreal, Omicil spends his time between Miami and Paris.

Early life 
Jowee Omicil was born to Rose-Annette Innocent and Joseph C. Omicil, a pastor. Omicil's mother passed when he was only 5 years old.

Career 

Omicil was 15 when his father enrolled him in music school, much to his own surprise. The intent was to have him learn an instrument to accompany the church choir. However Omicil was directed away from his first choice of the piano which already had too many students and he eventually chose the alto saxophone. Three years into his studies Omicil was offered a scholarship to the prestigious Berklee College of Music in Boston, where he majored in Music Education. Later on he also attended the Thelonious Monk Institute of Jazz among the 20 finalists and was featured on BET Jazz. Over the course of his career Omicil has played with a number of prominent musicians such as Branford Marsalis, Richard Bona, Kenny Garrett, Marcus Miller, Pharoah Sanders, Wyclef Jean, Harold Faustin and Cimafunk to name a few. In July 2018 Omicil served as master of ceremony at a tribute concert celebrating Quincy Jones' 85th birthday at Montreux, Switzerland. Omicil appears in the Damien Chazelle-created Netflix show The Eddy.
2020 and 2021 has been very productive for Jowee BasH! He used his time during the pandemic to release a solo album, "LeKture"!
In parallel he did a creation  " Y Pati ", a duet with the American Hollywood pianist Randy Kerber, whom he met on the set of the series The Eddy! 
Y Pati was released in December 2020!
Also, the "Big In Jazz Collective"  was born with the release in July 2021 of the Album "Global".
Finally at the end of 2020 Jowee returns to the studio with the brothers Louis and François Moutin and they recorded "M.O.M"  which was released in September 2021 on Laborie Jazz Records.
Without forgetting other numerous collaborations, with artists from all horizons such as Anne Sila, Ibrahim Maalouf, Napoleon Maddox & Sorg, Kandy Guira, Sopico, Kazy Lambist, Pongo...

Discography

Soundtrack

 2013: Ayiti Toma, The Land of The Living, documentary by Joseph Hillel
 2020: THE EDDY Netflix Show Joanna Kulig (vocals), Jorja Smith (Vocals), Sopico (Vocals), Jowee Omicil (saxophones), Randy Kerber (piano), Damian Nueva (bass), Ludovic Louis (Trumpets), Lada Obradovic (drums)

Collaborations
{| class="wikitable"
|-
! Year !! Artist !! Album/Title !! Label !! Featured personnel
|-
|2021|| Anne Sila || A Nos Cœurs/Interlude C’est Quoi; Interlude Track Of Time || PlayTwo || Anne Sila (vocals); Jowee Omicil (saxophone); Jendah Manga (Electric bass); Arnaud Dolmen (drums); Mario Canonge (piano)
|-
|2021|| Napoleon Maddox & Sorg || L’ouverture de Toussaint || TBD ||  Napoleon Maddox (Vocals); Sorg (producer) Jowee Omicil (alto & soprano saxophone, vocals)
|-
|2021|| Ludovic Louis || Rebirth/ Everybody || Ludo Louis Productions || Ludovic Louis (Trumpet, Vocals); Jowee Omicil (Hype vocals);
|-
|2021|| Kandy Guira || Nagtaba/ Africa || KDBES || Kandy Guira (Vocals); Jowee Omicil (saxophone)
|-
|2021|| Anissa Altmayer || #1/Le Chemin || Octava Bassa ||  Anissa Altmayer (Vocals, cello); Jowee Omicil (soprano saxophone)
|-
|2020 || Sopico || ‘’Épisode 0/ Thème || Universal Music || Sopico (Vocals); Jowee Omicil (soprano saxophone)
|-
|2020|| Ibrahim Maalouf || 40  Mélodies/ Sensuality || Mister IBÉ || Ibrahim Maalouf (trumpet); François Delporte (guitarist); Jowee Omicil (saxophone)
|-
|2020|| Kazy Lambist || Sky Kiss/ OH MY GOD || Cinq 7/ Wagram Music || Kazy Lambist (Vocals); Jowee Omicil (piccolo); Glasses (vocals)
|-
|2020|| Kazy Lambist || Sky Kiss/ Sky Kiss || Cinq 7/ Wagram Music || Kazy Lambist (Vocals); Jowee Omicil (piccolo); Jean-Benoit Dunckel half of Air (keys and production)
|-
|2019|| Jonathan Jurion || Le Temps Fou/ Capricorn Moon; Bismillah Rrahmani Rrahim; Once Upon A Time || Komos ||  Jonathan Jurion (piano); Jowee Omicil (soprano & alto saxophone); Arnaud Dolmen (drums); Michel Alibo (Bass); Josaiah Woodson (trumpet)
|-
|2019|| GUTS || Philanthropiques/Voyaging Bird; Li Dous Konsa; Bougé Bagay La || Heavenly Sweetness ||  GUTS; Jowee Omicil (saxophones, vocals and composer)
|-
|2019|| Kazy Lambist || Single: Tous Les Jours || Cinq 7/ Wagram Music || Kazy Lambist (Vocals); Jowee Omicil (composer and alto sax, soprano sax); Amoué (vocals)
|-
|2018|| Kazy Lambist || Single: WORK || Cinq 7/ Wagram Music || Kazy Lambist (Vocals); Jowee Omicil (soprano saxophone, vocals); Pongo (vocals)
|-
| ||  || '''' ||  || 
|-
| 2011 || Francisco Mela & Cuban Safari || Tree of life || Half Note || Francisco Mela (drums, vocals); Elio Villafranca (piano); Leo Genovese (piano); Uri Gurvich  (saxophone); Ben Monder (guitar); Luques Curtis (bass); Mauricio Herrera (percussion); Esperanza Spalding (vocals) track 4; Peter Slavov (bass); Arturo Stable (percussion); Jowee Omicil (saxophone)
|}

Movie
 2021: Big In Jazz Collective, documentary by Marina Jallier

 2020: The Eddy, Netflix show, directed by Damien Chazelle, Houda Benyamina, Laïla Marrakchi and Alan Poul
 2019: This Is The Bash'', feature documentary by Mario Tahi Lathan

References

External links
 

1977 births
21st-century Canadian composers
Black Canadian musicians
Canadian jazz composers
Canadian saxophonists
Canadian people of Haitian descent
Living people
Musicians from Montreal
21st-century jazz composers